Viktor Miroshnichenko (born 1 December 1959 in Donetsk, Ukrainian SSR) is a retired Ukrainian boxer, who represented the USSR at the 1980 Summer Olympics in Moscow, Soviet Union. There he won the silver medal in the flyweight division (– 51 kg), after being defeated in the final by Bulgaria's Petar Lesov. Two years later he captured the silver medal at the World Championships in Munich, West Germany. Miroshnichenko trained at Dynamo in Donetsk.

1980 Olympic results 
Below are the results of Viktor Miroshnichenko, a flyweight boxer from the Soviet Union who competed at the 1980 Moscow Olympics:

Round of 32: bye
Round of 16: Defeated Jorge Hernández (Cuba) by decision, 4-1
Quarterfinal: Defeated Henryk Średnicki (Poland) by decision, 5-0
Semifinal: Defeated János Váradi (Hungary) by decision, 4-1
Final: Lost to Peter Lessov (Bulgaria) referee stopped contest in round 2 (was awarded silver medal)

References
 databaseOlympics
sports-reference

1959 births
Living people
Soviet male boxers
Dynamo sports society athletes
Flyweight boxers
Boxers at the 1980 Summer Olympics
Olympic boxers of the Soviet Union
Olympic silver medalists for the Soviet Union
Olympic medalists in boxing
Sportspeople from Donetsk
Ukrainian male boxers
AIBA World Boxing Championships medalists
Medalists at the 1980 Summer Olympics